Daniel Paul Amos (born August 13, 1951 in Pensacola, Florida) is an American business executive. He serves as the chairman and chief executive officer of Aflac and Aflac Incorporated.

Early life
Daniel Amos was born on August 13, 1951 in Pensacola, Florida. He is the son of Aflac co-founder Paul Amos.

Amos graduated from the University of Georgia, where he received a bachelor's degree with a focus on risk management and was a member of the Sigma Nu fraternity. He also attended Emory University, where he earned an MBA.

Career
Amos joined Aflac in 1973, working in sales for 10 years, during which time, he was the Company's top sales person. He was named president of Aflac in 1983, chief operating officer in 1987, chief executive officer of Aflac Incorporated in 1990(2), and chair in 2001(3). Aflac, a Fortune 500 company, insures more than 50 million people worldwide. It is the leading provider of individual insurance policies offered at the worksite in the United States and is the largest life insurer in Japan in terms of individual policies in force.

During Mr. Amos's tenure as CEO, revenues at Aflac have grown from $2.7 billion in 1990 to $22.1 billion as of December 31, 2021. The company has appeared on Fortune's Most Admired Companies list 21 times. Aflac also appeared on Fortune's 100 Best Companies to Work For list for 20 consecutive years. Aflac is the only insurance company listed as an Ethisphere Magazine World's Most Ethical Company 16 times, or every year since the inception of the award in 2007. Amos received the Dr. Martin Luther King Jr. Unity Award and the Torch of Liberty Award from the Anti-Defamation League. He was named by the Harvard Business Review as one of the Best-Performing CEOs in the World four times and has been named as one of America's Best CEOs by Institutional Investor magazine five times. He has also appeared on Chief Executive Magazine's annual Wealth Creation Index.

In 2013, Dan proudly accepted the Salute to Greatness Award from the Dr. Martin Luther King Jr. Center in Atlanta, joining a distinguished list of past recipients, including Ambassador Andrew J. Young, U.S. Poet Laureate Maya Angelou, Ervin "Magic" Johnson, and musicians Bono and Stevie Wonder. He has also received the Anti-Defamation League's Torch of Liberty Award.

In 2008, Aflac became the first major U.S. firm to voluntarily afford shareholders an advisory vote on executive pay packages, including that of the CEO. Shareholders supported the company's executive compensation packages annually from 2008 to 2020.

Amos previously served as a member of the Consumer Affairs Advisory Committee of the Securities and Exchange Commission.

Philanthropy
In 1995, Dan inspired Aflac’s decades-long commitment to helping families of children diagnosed with cancer. The company and its independent sales associates have contributed more than $158 million to this cause, including funding for the Aflac Cancer and Blood Disorders Center of Children’s Healthcare of Atlanta, which has become a leading childhood cancer facility in the United States as rated by U.S. News & World Report. In taking this commitment to the next level, Dan is the driving force behind the My Special Aflac Duck®, the company’s social robot that uses medical play, lifelike movement and emotions to engage and help comfort kids during their cancer and blood disorders care. In 2018, the innovative My Special Aflac Duck was named Best in Show at the Consumer Electronics Show in Las Vegas and Time magazine named My Special Aflac Duck one of the Best Inventions of 2018. As of December 2021, more than 13,100 ducks have been delivered to children with cancer, free of charge. In 2022 Aflac expanded the My Special Aflac Duck program to include children with sickle cell disease and blood disorders.

A past member of the board of trustees of Children's Healthcare of Atlanta, Dan serves on the board of the House of Mercy of Columbus, Georgia. He is former chair of the board of the Japan-America Society of Georgia and chair emeritus of the University of Georgia Foundation.

References 

1951 births
Living people
People from Columbus, Georgia
Terry College of Business alumni
American chief operating officers
American chief executives of financial services companies
People from Enterprise, Alabama